The 2019 Sikkim Premier Division League was the eighth season of the Sikkim Premier Division League, the top division football league in the Indian state of Sikkim. The league kicked off from 24 August 2019, with eight teams competing.

Teams
 Boys Club
 Kumar Sporting FC
 Sikkim Aakraman FC
 Gangtok Himalayan SC
 Sikkim Police FC
 State Sports Academy 
 Unicorn FC
 United Sikkim FC

Standings

Note
Sikkim Football Association imposed a one-year ban for the Sikkim Aakraman FC. Three players and a coach were accused of assaulting referee after the match against Sikkim Police FC at Paljor Stadium, Gangtok on 10 September 2019. The league was suspended on 17 September 2019 following disputes between The Football Players Association of Sikkim (FCAS) and the Sikkim Football Association (SFA).

References

Sikkim Premier Division League
2019–20 in Indian football leagues